Hackmann is a surname of German origin, originating as an occupational surname for a butcher or woodcutter. Notable people with the surname include:

Heide Hackmann, South African interim director and CEO
Hermann Hackmann (1913-1994), German war criminal

See also
Barbara Ann Hackmann Taylor (1943-1967), American murder victim
Hackman (surname)